Asthena is a genus of moths in the family Geometridae.

Species
 Asthena albidaria (Leech, 1897)
 Asthena albosignata (Moore, 1888)
 Asthena albulata – small white wave (Hufnagel, 1767)
 Asthena amurensis (Staudinger, 1897)
 Asthena anseraria (Herrich-Schäffer, 1855)
 Asthena lactularia (Herrich-Schäffer, 1855)
 Asthena lassa Prout, 1926
 Asthena livida (Warren, 1896)
 Asthena melanosticta Wehrli, 1924
 Asthena nymphaeata Staudinger, 1897
 Asthena ochrifasciaria (Leech, 1897)
 Asthena octomacularia Leech, 1897
 Asthena opedogramma (Prout, 1926)
 Asthena plenaria (Leech, 1897)
 Asthena sachalinensis Matsumura, 1925
 Asthena tchratchraria (Oberthür, 1893)
 Asthena undulata (Wileman, 1915)

Excluded species
The following species have been excluded from the genus, but have not been reassigned to another genus.
 Asthena argentipuncta Warren, 1906
 Asthena argyrorrhytes Prout, 1916
 Asthena aurantiaca Prout, 1926
 Asthena eurychora Prout, 1928
 Asthena subditaria Warren, 1906

Former species
 Asthena chionata is now Hydrelia chionata (Lederer, 1870)
 Asthena distinctaria is now Pseudostegania distinctaria (Leech, 1897)
 Asthena percandidata is now Hydrelia percandidata (Christoph, 1893)
 Asthena straminearia is now Pseudostegania straminearia (Leech, 1897)
 Asthena yargongaria is now Pseudostegania yargongaria (Oberthur, 1916)

References

 , 2012: Taxonomic review of the genus Asthena Hübner (Lepidoptera: Geometridae) in Korea. Entomological Research 42 (3): 151-157. Abstract: .
  2011: A morphological review of tribes in Larentiinae (Lepidoptera: Geometridae). Zootaxa, 3136: 1–44. Preview

External links
 

 
Asthenini
Geometridae genera